Jennifer Thomas (born June 23, 1977) is an American pianist, violinist, composer, performing artist, and recording artist. She was classically trained starting at the age of 5, and began composing in 2003, later releasing her debut album in 2007.

Thomas has issued six albums, the latest, The Fire Within, was released in October 2018, and debuted at number 3 in the Billboard Classical music charts, number 2 in their Classical Crossover music charts, and number 25 in the Top Heatseekers.

Several of her original compositions and arrangements have been used in routines by International Skating Union Ice skaters at the 2022 Winter Olympics and by 2020 Summer Olympics gymnasts.

Thomas's YouTube video recordings have achieved a total of over 10 million views, with over 1.7 million viewing a live concert performance of her arrangement of "Carol of the Bells" from her 2015 Christmas album, Winter Symphony. This performance was in December 2015 at Benaroya Hall in Seattle, with the Ensign Symphony & Chorus.

Early life
Thomas was born in Seattle, Washington. She got her first toy piano at the age of 3 and began formal lessons on both the piano and violin at the age of 5, under the tutelage of her mother, Carolyn Southworth. Her brothers also learned piano, violin, and cello from their mother. Jennifer and her older brother played in grade school orchestras, with Southworth as a conductor's assistant. Thomas continued to train classically and was involved in many recitals and piano adjudications through her teen years. She played with various youth orchestras and high school orchestras. She performed at her high school graduation, and later went to Brigham Young University - Idaho.

At Brigham Young University–Idaho, Thomas studied piano under Professor Stephen Allen. She was a member of the university's Piano Ensemble group, accompanied the College choir and many vocal/instrumental students, as well as played violin in the university symphony. Thomas also competed in the University's Concerto Competition, where she took 2nd place performing the Piano Concerto No. 3 (Prokofiev).

After college graduation, Thomas moved to Salt Lake City, Utah, and was a regular performer with the Temple Square Concert Series, and played violin in the Murray Symphony orchestra. While performing with the Murray Symphony, Thomas was a featured soloist on the Edward MacDowell Piano Concerto No. 2.  She eventually moved to Northwest, where she performed as a violinist with the Oregon Pro Arte Chamber Orchestra, and worked for the Seattle Symphony in the Education Department. It was during her time working for the Seattle Symphony when she started composing her own original music.

Career
Thomas is known for writing and performing piano-centered orchestral music from classical music to crossover music and cinematic orchestral epic music. While most of her works are original, she also covers classical pieces as well as pop music and movie soundtracks. Thomas has also composed film scores, where she won the Gold Medal of Excellence in the 2011 Park City Film Music Festival for "Music in a Short Film" as well as a 2012 Hollywood Music in Media Award for "Best Film Score for Documentary/Short".

Thomas' third album, Illumination, won "Album of the Year" and "Artist of the Year" at the 2013 IMC Awards. In October 2015 Illumination also won the "Classical Song of the Year" International Music and Entertainment Association Award, and the Enlightened Piano Radio Award for "Best piano album with instrumentation" at Carnegie Hall New York City – where she performed live at the awards ceremony.

Winter Symphony, Thomas' fourth album was released in November 2015. Mixed by five time Grammy Award winner Brian Vibberts, contributors included Glen Gabriel, Ricky Kej and Taylor Davis (violinist).  Following the album release, Thomas performed concerts at Salt Lake City, Atascocita, Texas and the Benaroya Hall Seattle. The album has received many favorable reviews and during 2016 won several prestigious awards.

In March 2017, Thomas arranged an orchestral cover of the Beauty and the Beast (Disney song) featuring cellist Armen Ksajikian to coincide with the release of the Walt Disney Pictures and Mandeville Films movie Beauty and the Beast (2017 film). During July 2017 Thomas collaborated with poet J.ournal to produce a double award-winning track and video Nine Twelve, a powerful 9/11 reminder message, October 2017 saw a 10-year special re-mastered edition of her 2007 album Key of Sea.

On 12 October 2018, Thomas widely released a Billboard charting classical/cinematic music styled album titled The Fire Within which she previewed live in concert at Benaroya Hall in Seattle. During the winter of 2018 a composition by Thomas, A Beautiful Storm, was used in ISU Grand Prix of Figure Skating gold medal programmes by Rika Kihira from Japan. Following this a partnership was established with Avex Entertainment to promote her album Key of Sea in Japan

Commencing June 19, 2019, Thomas embarked on a well-received summer concert tour of the western United States.
During 2019 more ice skating recognition of her music continued when her composition “Illumination” was performed to in a free skate program by American Alysa Liu to win the ISU Junior Grand Prix in the United States. Liu retained the title in 2020 skating to the same composition. 2020 also saw Cha Jun-hwan win the South Korean figure skating championships performing to the Thomas and Kimberly StarKey composition The Fire Within.

In March 2021, Thomas's music was performed in the 2021 World Figure Skating Championships by Rika Kihira, Cha Jun-hwan and Alexandra Feigin and in April by Rika Kihira for the ISU World Team Trophy in Figure Skating.

The 2020 Summer Olympics, held in Tokyo, Japan July 2021, saw her original composition Winter Symphony performed by Russian Olympic Committee gold medallist gymnast Vladislava Urazova and her arrangement of Tchaikovsky's Dance of the Sugar Plum Fairy used in a routine by 21st placed finalist gymnast Lee Yun-seo from South Korea. At the 2022 Winter Olympics held in Beijing China, Karen Chen representing Team USA ( who won a silver medal) skated to a Jennifer Thomas, Escala (group) and Hugo Choinard mix of "Requiem for a Tower" and "Requiem for a Dream", composed by Clint Mansell.

Personal life
Thomas is married to Will Thomas, an ultra-marathon competitor who, in 2015, competed in the 106-mile race Ultra-Trail du Mont-Blanc in France. Together, they have three children and reside in the Seattle, Washington area.

Discography

Albums

All Music 

Thomas also features on the following albums;

Discogs

Awards and nominations

Film and Televised ice skating and gymnastics events coverage
 2022 Team USA Figure skating at the 2022 Winter Olympics - 'Requiem for a Tower' and 'Requiem for a Dream', mix, performed by Karen Chen.
 2021 2020 Summer Olympics Gymnastics - Two works performed, Winter Symphony performed by Vladislava Urazova and her arrangement of Tchaikovsky's Dance of the Sugar Plum Fairy by Lee Yun-seo
 2021 ISU World Team Trophy in Figure Skating 'The Fire Within' performed by Rika Kihira. 
 2021 2021 World Figure Skating Championships - Two works performed, 'The Fire Within' by Rika Kihira and Cha Jun-hwan, 'Moonlight' by Alexandra Feigin.
 2020 South Korean Figure Skating Championships Senior gold medal won by Cha Jun-hwan to the program of an original Thomas composition The Fire Within (album).
 2020 US Figure Skating Championships gold medal won by Alysa Liu to the program of New World Symphony from the album Illumination composed by Thomas
 2019 2019 ISU Jr Grand Prix Final figure skating gold medal won by Alysa Liu to the program of New World Symphony from the album Illumination composed by Thomas
 2018 2018 NHK Trophy Grand Prix figure skating gold medal won by Rika Kihira to the program of A Beautiful Storm composed by Thomas
 2017 Film Score "Desert Rose"
 2015 U.S. Figure Skating Championships, Hannah Miller, Short program
 2014 ISU Junior Grand Prix, Zagreb, Karen Chen
 2013 International Skating Union, Angela Wang JGP Baltic Cup Junior Ladies Short program
 2013 "Running the Edge", directed by Matt Trappe, song placements
 2011 Film score "Minuet", directed and written by Ryan K. McNeal, score by Jennifer Thomas
 2012 National Basketball Association Sports placements
 2012 NBC Universal Sports placements
 2014 MGM Equal Justice (TV series) placements
 2008 "Reasons", Poor Boyz Productions

References

External links

Profile, AllMusic
Reviews
WordPress Musical Meanderings
Interview

1977 births
21st-century American composers
21st-century American pianists
21st-century American women pianists
21st-century women composers
American film score composers
American women film score composers
Avex Group artists
Brigham Young University alumni
Living people
Musicians from Seattle